XHUNES-FM is a radio station on 92.9 FM in Durango, Durango. It is branded as España FM and operated by the Universidad España, a private institution of higher education.

History
The Universidad España, legally known as the Universidad Autónoma España de Durango, received a permit for an FM station on November 8, 2004. The university, which uses the acronym UNES, promptly applied to have the calls of the station changed to XHUNES-FM  from XHUAED-FM and to build the station with a power of 10,000 watts instead of 3,000, both approved.

References

 Official website

Radio stations in Durango
Mass media in Durango City
University radio stations in Mexico